Gymnostephium is a genus of flowering plants in the family Asteraceae.

 Species
All the species are endemic to the Cape Provinces region of South Africa.

References

Asteraceae genera
Astereae
Flora of the Cape Provinces
Endemic flora of South Africa